Jiangning Subdistrict (江宁街道) is a subdistrict of Jiangning District, Nanjing, Jiangsu, China. 

Township-level divisions of Jiangsu
Geography of Nanjing